Pedro Martínez (born 1971) is a Dominican baseball player who became a member of the (U.S.) Baseball Hall of Fame in 2015.

Pedro Martínez may also refer to:

People
Pedro Martínez (left-handed pitcher) (born 1968), Dominican baseball player
Pedro Martínez (basketball), Spanish basketball coach
Pedro Martínez (Argentine footballer) (1893–1931)
Pedro Martínez (golfer) (born 1963), Paraguayan golfer
Pedro Martínez de la Rosa, Spanish Formula One driver
Pedro Martínez de Luna y Pérez de Gotor (1328–1423), antipope of the Catholic Church
Pedro Martínez (tennis) (born 1997), Spanish tennis player
Pedro (footballer, born 1978), Spanish footballer
Pedro Martinez (school administrator), Mexican-American CEO of Chicago Public Schools

Places
Pedro Martínez, Granada, municipality in the province of Granada, Andalusia

Human name disambiguation pages